List of U.S. cities over 200,000 population, by foreign-born population, 2009
This table covers only central cities, not metropolitan areas.
Source: U.S. Census

American people by ethnic or national origin
Foreign-born